Raza Ur Rehman (born 5 November 1985) is an international cricketer who plays for the Canada national cricket team. Raza bats right-handed and bowls left-arm medium-fast.

Career
Raza made his One Day International debut against Kenya on 11 May 2013. On debut he scored 70 runs from 83 balls. Raza played his maiden first-class match against Kenya on 28 March 2013.

References

External links

1985 births
Living people
Canadian cricketers
Canada One Day International cricketers
Canada Twenty20 International cricketers
Zimbabwean emigrants to Canada
Zimbabwean cricketers